Fedir Serafymovych Lashchonov (Fyodor Serafimovich Lashchyonov, born 4 November 1950 in Rovenky, Ukrainian SSR) is a Ukrainian former volleyball player who competed for the Soviet Union in the 1980 Summer Olympics.

He was born in Rovenky, Luhansk Oblast.

In 1980, he was part of the Soviet team which won the gold medal in the Olympic tournament. He played four matches.

External links
profile

1950 births
Living people
People from Rovenky
Ukrainian men's volleyball players
Soviet men's volleyball players
Olympic volleyball players of the Soviet Union
Volleyball players at the 1980 Summer Olympics
Olympic gold medalists for the Soviet Union
Olympic medalists in volleyball
Medalists at the 1980 Summer Olympics
Sportspeople from Luhansk Oblast